Lacerba was an Italian literary journal based in Florence closely associated with the Futurist movement. It published many Futurist manifestos by Filippo Marinetti, Antonio Sant'Elia, and others.

The magazine was started as a fortnightly magazine on 1 January 1913. Its frequency was later changed to weekly.

The paper had no official editor. Ardengo Soffici and Giovanni Papini were two of the principal contributors. Lacerba ceased publication on 22 May 1915.

See also
Poesia (magazine)

References

External links

1913 establishments in Italy
1915 disestablishments in Italy
Biweekly magazines published in Italy
Defunct literary magazines published in Italy
Italian Futurism
Italian-language magazines
Magazines established in 1913
Magazines disestablished in 1915
Magazines published in Florence
Visual arts magazines published in Italy
Weekly magazines published in Italy